Prasco Park is a baseball park located in Mason, Ohio, a suburb of Cincinnati. The ballpark opened in June 2008 on the campus of Prasco Laboratories, a pharmaceutical company. The facility serves as the home for a youth travel baseball club, the Cincinnati Spikes, and additionally hosts major college baseball tournaments. Prasco Park hosts conference championship tournaments for both the Big East Conference and the Great Midwest Athletic Conference.

References

External links
 Prasco Park

College baseball venues in the United States
Baseball venues in Ohio
Mason, Ohio